Óscar Puente Santiago (born 15 November 1968) is a Spanish Socialist Workers' Party (PSOE) politician. He has been a city councillor in Valladolid since 2007 and the city's mayor since 2015.

Biography
Born in Valladolid, Puente was the son and grandson of socialists. He achieved a master's degree in Political Management in 1992 and a Law degree from the University of Valladolid a year later. After two years of internship, he began practicing law in 1995.

Active in the Spanish Socialist Workers' Party (PSOE) from 1990, he began working for the party as a General Vice Secretary in the provincial executive in 2004, having run for secretary general four years earlier. Elected to Valladolid City Council in 2007, he replaced Soraya Rodríguez as party spokesperson in the city hall the following year, and in 2009 became secretary general of the PSOE in the city.

In September 2010, Puente was endorsed by the PSOE at local and provincial level to be their mayoral candidate in Valladolid in the 2011 Spanish local elections. In the elections in May, People's Party (PP) incumbent Francisco Javier León de la Riva took a majority and rose from 15 seats to 17, while the PSOE fell from 13 to 9.

In the 2015 local elections, the PSOE had eight seats, and with the support of the seven seats held by local left-wing parties, they gained the majority to make him mayor and end the 20-year tenure of León de la Riva.

In a municipal session in June 2018, Puente questioned the management skills of Citizens spokesperson Pilar Vicente by pointing out that she used to be a store assistant at the VallSur shopping centre. Albert Rivera, the national leader of Citizens, considered this to be a classist and male chauvinist insult and called for Puente to resign. Puente said that he was referring to what he believed to be falsehoods in Vicente's curriculum vitae, and that Rivera had exaggerated the episode.

Personal life
He is married to judge Laura Soria Velasco and has two daughters. His daughter Carmen took part on the sixth season of La Voz Kids in 2021, reaching the semi-finals.

References 

1968 births
Living people
20th-century Spanish politicians
21st-century Spanish politicians
20th-century Spanish lawyers
21st-century Spanish lawyers
Spanish Socialist Workers' Party politicians
University of Valladolid alumni
Valladolid city councillors
Mayors of Valladolid